The R409 road is a regional road in Ireland that passes through the village of Caragh in County Kildare. It starts at Naas and travels north-west through Caragh village, passes Mondello Park race-track and ends at the intersection with the R403 road.

See also
Roads in Ireland
National primary road
National secondary road

References
Roads Act 1993 (Classification of Regional Roads) Order 2006 – Department of Transport

Regional roads in the Republic of Ireland
Roads in County Kildare